The facial skeleton comprises the facial bones that may attach to build a portion of the skull. The remainder of the skull is the braincase.

In human anatomy and development, the facial skeleton is sometimes called the membranous viscerocranium, which comprises the mandible and dermatocranial elements that are not part of the braincase.

Structure
In the human skull, the facial skeleton consists of fourteen bones in the face:
 Inferior turbinal (2)
 Lacrimal bones (2)
 Mandible
 Maxilla (2)
 Nasal bones (2)
 Palatine bones (2)
 Vomer
 Zygomatic bones (2)

Variations
Elements of the cartilaginous viscerocranium (i.e., splanchnocranial elements), such as the hyoid bone, are sometimes considered part of the facial skeleton. The ethmoid bone (or a part of it) and also the sphenoid bone are sometimes included, but otherwise considered part of the neurocranium. Because the maxillary bones are fused, they are often collectively listed as only one bone. The mandible is generally considered separately from the cranium.

Development 
The facial skeleton is composed of dermal bone and derived from the neural crest cells (also responsible for the development of the neurocranium, teeth and adrenal medulla) or from the sclerotome, which derives from the somite block of the mesoderm. As with the neurocranium, in Chondricthyes and other cartilaginous vertebrates, they are not replaced via endochondral ossification.

Variation in craniofacial form between humans is largely due to differing patterns of biological inheritance. Cross-analysis of osteological variables and genome-wide SNPs has identified specific genes that control this craniofacial development. Of these genes, DCHS2, RUNX2, GLI3, PAX1 and PAX3 were found to determine nasal morphology, whereas EDAR impacts chin protrusion.

Additional images

See also 
 Axial skeleton
 Appendicular skeleton

References

External links

  - "Facial Bone Anatomy"

Bones of the head and neck
Facial features
Facial bones

de:Schädel#Die Knochen des Schädels